Trepanning, also known as trepanation, trephination, trephining or making a burr hole (the verb trepan derives from Old French from Medieval Latin  from Greek , literally "borer, auger"), is a surgical intervention in which a hole is drilled or scraped into the human skull. The intentional perforation of the cranium exposes the dura mater to treat health problems related to intracranial diseases or release pressured blood buildup from an injury. It may also refer to any "burr" hole created through other body surfaces, including nail beds.  A trephine is an instrument used for cutting out a round piece of skull bone to relieve pressure beneath a surface.

In ancient times, holes were drilled into a person who was behaving in what was considered an abnormal way to let out what people believed were evil spirits. Evidence of trepanation has been found in prehistoric human remains from Neolithic times onward. The bone that was trepanned was kept by the prehistoric people and may have been worn as a charm to keep evil spirits away. Evidence also suggests that trepanation was primitive emergency surgery after head wounds to remove shattered bits of bone from a fractured skull and clean out the blood that often pools under the skull after a blow to the head. Hunting accidents, falls, wild animals, and weapons such as clubs or spears could have caused such injuries. Trepanations appear to have been most common in areas where weapons that could produce skull fractures were used. The primary theories for the practice of trepanation in ancient times include spiritual purposes and treatment for epilepsy, head wound, mental disorders, and headache, although the latter may be just an unfounded myth.

In modern eye surgery, a trephine instrument is used in corneal transplant surgery. The procedure of drilling a hole through a fingernail or toenail is also known as trephination. It is performed by a physician or surgeon to relieve the pain associated with a subungual hematoma (blood under the nail); a small amount of blood is expressed through the hole and the pain associated with the pressure is partially alleviated. Similarly, in abdominal surgery, a trephine incision is when a small disc of abdominal skin is excised to accommodate a stoma.  Although the abdominal wall does not contain bone, the use of the word trephine in this context may relate to the round excised area of skin being similar in shape to a burr hole.

History

Prehistoric evidence 
Trepanation dates back to 7,000–10,000 years ago, and it is perhaps the oldest surgical procedure for which there is archaeological evidence, and in some areas may have been quite widespread. The main pieces of archaeological evidence are in the forms of cave paintings and human remains. At one burial site in France dated to 6500 BCE, 40 out of 120 prehistoric skulls found had trepanation holes. At the time only around 40% of people survived the procedure.

More than 1,500 trephined skulls from the Neolithic period (representing 5–10% of all Stone Age skulls) have been uncovered throughout the worldfrom Europe, Siberia, China and the Americas. Most of the trephined crania belong to adult males, but women and children are also represented. 

There also exists evidence of trepanation being performed on a cow in France around 3400–3000 BCE. If performed while alive, the cow did not survive the procedure. It is unclear if this was performed as a veterinary procedure, medical experimentation, or for another reason. It would be the earliest archaeological example of veterinary surgery or animal medical experimentation if those were the reasons.

Pre-Columbian Mesoamerica 

In the more recent times of postclassical pre-Columbian Mesoamerica, evidence for the practice of trepanation and an assortment of other cranial deformation techniques comes from a variety of sources, including physical cranial remains of burials, allusions in iconographic artworks and reports from the post-colonial period.

Among New World societies, trepanning is most commonly found in the Andean civilizations, such as pre-Incan cultures. For example, the Paracas culture Ica, situated in what is now known as Ica, located south of Lima. Trepanation has also been found in the Muisca Confederation (in modern-day Colombia) and the Inca Empire. In both, even cranioplasty existed. The prevalence of trepanation among Mesoamerican civilizations is much lower, at least judging from the comparatively few trepanned crania that have been uncovered.

The archaeological record in Mesoamerica is further complicated by the practice of skull mutilation and modification carried out after the death of the subject, to fashion "trophy skulls" and the like of captives and enemies.  This was a widespread tradition, illustrated in pre-Columbian art that occasionally depicts rulers adorned with or carrying the modified skulls of their defeated enemies, or of the ritualistic display of sacrificial victims. Several Mesoamerican cultures used a skull-rack (known by its Nahuatl term, tzompantli), on which skulls were impaled in rows or columns of wooden stakes. Even so, some evidence of genuine trepanation in Mesoamerica (i.e., where the subject was living) has survived.

The earliest archaeological survey published of trepanned crania was a late 19th-century study of several specimens recovered from the Tarahumara mountains by the Norwegian ethnographer Carl Lumholtz. Later studies documented cases identified from a range of sites in Oaxaca and central Mexico, such as Tilantongo, Oaxaca and the major Zapotec site of Monte Albán. Two specimens from the Tlatilco civilization's homelands (which flourished around 1400 BCE) indicate the practice has a lengthy tradition.

A study of ten low-status burials from the Late Classic period at Monte Albán concluded that the trepanation had been applied non-therapeutically. Since multiple techniques had been used and since some people had received more than one trepanation, the conclusion became that trepanning had been done experimentally. Inferring the events to represent experiments on people until they died, the study interpreted that use of trepanation as an indicator of the stressful sociopolitical climate that not long thereafter resulted in the abandonment of Monte Alban as the primary regional administrative center in the Oaxacan highlands.

Specimens identified from the Maya civilization region of southern Mexico, Guatemala and the Yucatán Peninsula show no evidence of the drilling or cutting techniques found in central and highland Mexico. Instead, the pre-Columbian Maya apparently used an abrasive technique that ground away at the back of the skull, thinning the bone and sometimes perforating it, similar to the examples from Cholula. Many skulls from the Maya region date from the Postclassic period, and include specimens found at Palenque in Chiapas, and recovered from the Sacred Cenote at the prominent Postclassic site of Chichen Itza in northern Yucatán.

Ancient China 
Before 2007, archaeological evidence of trepanation in ancient China was nonexistent. Since Chinese culture mainly focuses only on traditional Chinese medicine that usually entails non-surgical treatments such as acupuncture, balancing Qigong, cupping, herbal remedies, etc. The resulting misconception was that trepanation was not practiced in ancient China. However, in 2007, Han and Chen from the Institute of Archeology, Chinese Academy of Social Sciences looked at six trepanned skulls spanning between the Neolithic period through the Bronze and Iron Ages ( years ago) found in five different locations. Along with the discovery of these trepanned skulls, another collection of 13 trepanned skulls was discovered and dated to 3,000 years ago. In 2015, an intact 3,600-year-old mummy with a trepanned skull was discovered. Meanwhile, the oldest trepanned skull (M382) analysed by Han and Chen was radiocarbon dated to around 5,000 years ago and discovered at the Fuija site in Guangrao, Shandong. The skull, which belonged to an adult male, exhibited a right parietal calvarial defect (31 x 25 mm) with evidence of scraping by a trephine-like tool. Additionally, bone regeneration and smooth edges suggest that the subject recovered from the surgery and lived a relatively long time afterward.

The 3,600-year-old perforated skull of a mummified female dating to 1615 BCE was found in the Xiaohe tomb in China's Xinjiang Uygur Autonomous Region. The only known female with a trepanned skull, it showed signs of bone spurs growth and retraction of the edges, suggesting that she also survived the surgery. Found in a massive burial site, this mummy was one of the hundreds found in the "Little River" Tomb complex.

The Bronze Age was found to be the period with the largest number of trepanned skulls in ancient China.

Medieval East Africa 
Trephining has a long history in East Africa. Bones of depressed fractures were elevated by surgeons of Bunyoro-Kitara.<ref name="Davies 1959">{{cite journal | last=Davies | first=J. N. P. | title=The Development of Scientific' Medicine in the African Kingdom of Bunyoro-Kitara | journal=Medical History | volume=3 | issue=1 | pages=47–57 | year=1959 | issn=0025-7273 | doi=10.1017/s0025727300024248 | pmid=13632207 | pmc=1034446 }}</ref> The hair may or may not have been shaved depending upon the site of the operation.

Trepanning at the Kisii people in Kenya was filmed in 1958.

 Pre-modern Europe 
Trepanation was also practised in the classical and Renaissance periods. Hippocrates gave specific directions on the procedure from its evolution through the Greek age, and Galen also elaborates on the procedure. During the Middle Ages and the Renaissance, trepanation was practiced as a cure for various ailments, including seizures and skull fractures. Out of eight skulls with trepanations from the 6th to 8th centuries found in southwestern Germany, seven skulls show clear evidence of healing and survival after trepanation, suggesting that the survival rate of the operations was high and the infection rate was low.

In the graveyards of pre-Christian (Pagan) Magyars, archeologists found a surprisingly high frequency (12.5%) of skulls with trepanation, although more than 90% only partial (these served probably ritual purposes). The trepanation was performed on adults only, with similar frequencies for males and females, but increasing frequency with age and wealth. This custom suddenly disappeared with the Magyars' conversion to Christianity.

A small area near (modern) Rostov-on-Don, in southern Russia, may have been a centre for ritual trepanning, around 6000 years ago, according to archeologists who discovered remains of eight recipients of the practice, within a small area, all with the incision in the unusual obelion position, high on the back of the head.

During the 16th and 17th centuries, around 80% of people survived the procedure of trepanation.

 Modern medical practices 
The prefrontal leucotomy, a precursor to lobotomy, was performed by cutting a trephine hole into the skull, inserting an instrument, and destroying parts of the brain. This was later made unnecessary by the development of the orbital transit lobotomy where a spike was inserted through the eye-sockets.

Trepanation is a treatment used for epidural and subdural hematomas, and surgical access for certain other neurosurgical procedures, such as intracranial pressure monitoring. Modern surgeons generally use the term craniotomy for this procedure. However, unlike our ancestors, craniotomy must be done after diagnostic imaging (which included computed tomography and magnetic resonance imaging) pinpointed the issues within the brain. The preoperative imaging allows for accurate examination and evaluation. Unlike trepanation, the removed piece of skull is typically replaced as soon as possible. Trepanation instruments, nowadays being replaced with cranial drills, are now available with diamond-coated rims, which are less traumatic than the classical trephines with sharp teeth. They are smooth to soft tissues and cut only bone. Additionally, the specially designed drills come with a safety feature that prevents the drill from penetrating into the brain tissue (through the dura mater). Along with antisepsis and prophylaxis of infection, modern neurosurgery is a common procedure for many reasons other than head trauma.

In 20th century, in documented trepanning cases in Africa and Oceania, around 90% of people survived the procedure.

 The myth of trepanation as a treatment for headaches 
After the retrieval of some skulls from the Neolithic era that showed signs of trepanation, in the nineteenth century, the false belief that these holes were drilled for the treatment of headaches or other neurological disorders started spreading. During the 1870s, the French anthropologist and physician Paul Broca found several European and South American children’s skulls coming from the Neolithic age that were perforated surgically. Since no signs of fractures that could justify this complex procedure to relieve trauma were found, a debate flared to determine why these children were subjected to trepanation while they were still alive. Broca theorized that this operation had a ritual or religious purpose, probably to remove “confined demons” inside the head of the patient, or to create healing or fortune talismans with the removed skull fragments. However, he also suggested that the operation may have been performed to treat some infantile conditions such as febrile seizures to explain why it was performed only on children.

Broca never mentioned headaches, though, and the association was established only several decades later by the world-famous Canadian physician William Osler, in 1913. Osler misinterpreted Broca's words, and added other conditions such as “infantile convulsions, headache and various cerebral diseases believed to be caused by confined demons.” Osler's theory was seen as particularly palatable by other armchair anthropologists, who were fascinated by the idea that folk traditions and/or myths could be linked with the treatment for common conditions such as migraine. Eventually, what was nothing but speculation from Broca, quickly became a fact, and it became so in the misinterpreted version proposed by Osler as other physicians and historians kept confirming it without any actual evidence. To this day there's no credible evidence supporting this theory, especially since children are much less frequently affected by migraine and headache disorders than adults. Yet, this myth keeps existing even in modern age.

 Tools and methods 
As early as 7000 years ago, one of the alternative medicine practice was boring holes in the patient's neurocranium with the aim to cure and not to kill. Similar to bloodletting, trepanation was carried out for both medical reasons and mystical practice.

In ancient times, trepanation instruments were less complex, and were commonly made out of flint, obsidian, or harder material such as stone knives, and later with metal such as bronze and copper. Additionally, the procedure was done by shamans or witch doctors utilizing tumi (ceremonial knife in early Peru), sharpened seashells (South Pacific), a trephine drill, bronze knife, etc. The Greeks and Romans were the first to design medical instruments that were used to penetrate the skull.  Such instruments includes the terebra serrata made to perforate the cranium by manually rolling the instrument between the surgeon's hand. By the Renaissance period, when trepanation was routinely performed, a range of instruments was developed to accommodate the demand.

As many as five main methods were found for trephination: 
 Rectangular intersecting cuts
 Scraping utilizing an abrasive instrument such as flint
 Circular grooving
 Boring and cutting by a circular trephine or crown saw
 Burr hole done by drilling several circle holes closely to create a space and then cut/chisel the bone between the hole.
The scraping method was found to be the most common in prehistoric times. The differences in method vary in the amount and depth of bone being removed. The trepanation surgical procedure includes exposure of the dura mater without damaging the underlying blood vessels, meninges, and brain. Over time, the skin will reform over the puncture site, but the hole in the skull will remain.

The location of the trepanation on the skull varies by geographical region and period, common locations are the frontal and the occipital bones. In most cases, trepanation was a one-off operation, with only a small percentage of the trepanned skulls having undergone more than one surgery. In those with multiple openings, the extent of bone remodelling helps identify whether the opening was done at around the same time or at different times during the individual's life.

 Risks 
The procedure comes with severe repercussions such as direct or indirect perioperative complications, which include increased damage to the brain, infection, blood loss, hemorrhage, and potentially death due to the trauma as the skull's protective covering is compromised. It is not a risky procedure if the trepanation is done by a neurosurgeon, but self-trepanation has many risks. The operation leaves very minimal space for error and a high incidence of mortality if the dura mater is penetrated. Additionally, there is a high risk of infection if the operation is conducted with contaminated tools or improper sanitary wound care. If the infection is not caught and treated immediately, it can be fatal or lead to significant and permanent brain damage. After surgery, hyperemia and osteoclastic activity are seen on the necrotic bone surrounding the trepanation site, due to loss of blood supply.

The perforations were found with the growth of fine bone spurs, which indicate that trepanation had been carried out on live subjects, rather than being a ritual conducted after death. There is evidence that some individuals survived multiple skull surgeries. There is evidence of bone remodelling around the skull defects, corroborated by the smooth borders around the opening, sealed by a dense cortex of bone, denoting procedural success after trepanation. Furthermore, the survival rate of the operations was higher than expected and the infection rate relatively low. However, several skulls also show the risk of the operation, with some indicating the stopping mid-operation as the trephining is incomplete. Voluntary trepanation 
Since the early 1960s, voluntary trepanation has been performed by people interested in "enhancing mental power and well-being". The practice of trepanning also continues today due to belief in various pseudoscientific medical benefits. For example, some have tried trepanation as a means of emulating the "third eye", in order to achieve clairvoyance or enlightenment or even as a means of maintaining a "permanent state of euphoria". Other proponents claim that trepanning results in increased blood flow. Individuals have practiced non-emergency trepanning for psychological purposes. A prominent proponent of the modern view is Peter Halvorson, who drilled a hole in the front of his own skull to increase "brain blood volume".

One of the most prominent advocates of trepanning was Dutch librarian Bart Huges. In 1965, Huges drilled a hole in his own head with a dentist drill as a publicity stunt. Huges claimed that trepanning increases "brain blood volume" and thereby enhances cerebral metabolism in a manner similar to cerebral vasodilators such as ginkgo biloba. These claims are unsubstantiated by research. Huges and his girlfriend also made several comic books in the 1970s, which promoted trepanation.

In a chapter of his book Eccentric Lives & Peculiar Notions, esotericist John Michell cites Huges as pioneering the idea of trepanning in his 1962 monograph, Homo Sapiens Correctus, which is often cited by advocates of self-trepanation.  Among other arguments, Huges contends that children have a higher state of consciousness and since children's skulls are not fully closed, one can return to an earlier, childlike state of consciousness by self-trepanation.  Further, by allowing the brain to freely pulsate Huges argues that a number of benefits will accrue.

Michell quotes Joey Mellen's book, Bore Hole.  At the time the passage below was written, Joey and his partner, Amanda Feilding, had made two previous attempts at trepanning Mellen.  The second attempt ended up placing Mellen in the hospital, where he was reprimanded severely and sent for psychiatric evaluation.  After he returned home, Mellen decided to try again.  He describes his third attempt at self-trepanation:

After some time there was an ominous sounding schlurp and the sound of bubbling.  I drew the trepan out and the gurgling continued. It sounded like air bubbles running under the skull as they were pressed out. I looked at the trepan and there was a bit of bone in it. At last!

Feilding also performed a self-trepanation with a drill, while Mellen shot the operation for the short film "Heartbeat in the Brain", which was long thought to have been lost.  Portions of the film can be seen in the documentary A Hole in the Head''.

Michell also describes a British group that advocates self-trepanation to allow the brain access to more space and oxygen. Other modern practitioners of trepanation claim that it holds other medical benefits, such as a treatment for depression or other psychological ailments. In 2000, two men from Cedar City, Utah, were prosecuted for practicing medicine without a license after they performed a trepanation on an English woman to treat her chronic fatigue syndrome and depression.

See also 
 Craniotomy
 Mütter Museum
 Shrunken head

References

External links 

 WHO surgical instructions on burr holes
 Skeptic's Dictionary entry about Trepanation
 An illustrated history of trepanation
 Interview with self-trepanner Heather Perry
 ABC: A History of Craniotomy phisick.com 14 Nov 2011

Webarchive template wayback links
Body modification
History of neuroscience
Neurosurgical procedures
Obsolete medical procedures
Pseudoscience